German individualist philosopher Max Stirner became an important early influence in anarchism. Afterwards Johann Most became an important anarchist propagandist in both Germany and in the United States. In the late 19th century and early 20th century there appeared individualist anarchists influenced by Stirner such as John Henry Mackay, Adolf Brand and Anselm Ruest (Ernst Samuel) and Mynona (Salomo Friedlaender).

The anarchists Gustav Landauer, Silvio Gesell and Erich Mühsam had important leadership positions within the revolutionary councilist structures during the uprising at the late 1910s known as Bavarian Soviet Republic. During the rise of Nazi Germany, Erich Mühsam was assassinated in a Nazi concentration camp both for his anarchist positions and for his Jewish background. The anarchosyndicalist activist and writer Rudolf Rocker became an influential personality in the establishment of the international federation of anarchosyndicalist organizations called International Workers' Association as well as the Free Workers' Union of Germany.

Contemporary German anarchist organizations include the anarchosyndicalist Free Workers' Union and the Federation of German speaking Anarchists (Föderation Deutschsprachiger AnarchistInnen).

History

The roots of anarchism in Germany 
Anarchist historians often trace the roots of German anarchism back to the 16th century German Peasants' War. On the other hand, both James Joll and George Woodcock hold that this link is exaggerated. Later anarchists have also claimed the liberal thinking of Friedrich Schiller, Johann Wolfgang von Goethe, Gotthold Ephraim Lessing, and Heinrich Heine to be the precursors of anarchism.

In the first half of the 19th century, there was no significant anarchist movement in Germany to speak of, but several thinkers influenced by anarchism, particularly by Pierre-Joseph Proudhon. According to Gustav Landauer, the thinking of political satirist Ludwig Börne, though not anarchist, had some parallels to anarchism. 

Several German socialists of this period also exhibited anarchist tendencies. The young Wilhelm Weitling, influenced by both Proudhon and Louis Auguste Blanqui, once wrote that "a perfect society has no government, but only an administration, no laws, but only obligations, no punishment, but means of correction." Moses Hess was also an anarchist until around 1844, disseminating Proudhon's theories in Germany, but would go on to write the anti-anarchist pamphlet Die letzte Philosophie. Karl Grün, well known for his role in the disputes between Marx and Proudhon, held a view Nettlau would liken to communist anarchism while still living in Cologne and then left for Paris, where he became a disciple of Proudhon. Wilhelm Marr, born in Hamburg but primarily active in the Young Germany clubs in Switzerland, edited several antiauthoritarian periodicals. In his book on anarchism Anarchie oder Autorität, he comes to the conclusion that liberty is found only in anarchy.

German anarchists such as Max Nettlau and Gustav Landauer credited Edgar Bauer with founding the anarchist tradition in Germany. In 1843 he published a book titled The Conflict of Criticism with Church and State. This caused him to be charged with sedition. He was imprisoned for four years in the fortress at Magdeburg.

Max Stirner 
Max Stirner was a German philosopher, one of the literary fathers of nihilism, existentialism, post-modernism and anarchism, especially of individualist anarchism. Stirner's main work is The Ego and Its Own, also known as The Ego and His Own (Der Einzige und sein Eigentum in German, which translates literally as The Only One and his Property). This work was first published in 1844 in Leipzig, and has since appeared in numerous editions and translations.

Stirner's philosophy is usually called "egoism". He says that the egoist rejects pursuit of devotion to "a great idea, a good cause, a doctrine, a system, a lofty calling," saying that the egoist has no political calling but rather "lives themselves out" without regard to "how well or ill humanity may fare thereby." Stirner held that the only limitation on the rights of the individual is his power to obtain what he desires. He proposes that most commonly accepted social institutions—including the notion of State, property as a right, natural rights in general, and the very notion of society—were mere spooks in the mind. Stirner wanted to "abolish not only the state but also society as an institution responsible for its members."

Max Stirner's idea of the union of Egoists, was first expounded in The Ego and Its Own. The Union is understood as a non-systematic association, which Stirner proposed in contradistinction to the state. The Union is understood as a relation between egoists which is continually renewed by all parties' support through an act of will. The Union requires that all parties participate out of a conscious egoism. If one party silently finds themselves to be suffering, but puts up and keeps the appearance, the union has degenerated into something else. 

Although Stirner's philosophy is individualist, it has influenced some libertarian communists and anarcho-communists. "For Ourselves Council for Generalized Self-Management" discusses Stirner and speaks of a "communist egoism," which is said to be a "synthesis of individualism and collectivism," and says that "greed in its fullest sense is the only possible basis of communist society." Forms of libertarian communism such as insurrectionary anarchism are influenced by Stirner.

Johann Most 

Johann Joseph Most was a German-American politician, newspaper editor, and orator.  He is credited with popularizing the concept of "Propaganda of the deed".

As the 1860s drew to a close, Most was won over to the ideas of international socialism, an emerging political movement in Germany and Austria. Most saw in the doctrines of Karl Marx and Ferdinand Lassalle a blueprint for a new egalitarian society and became a fervid supporter of the Social Democracy, as the Marxist movement was known in the day. Most was repeatedly arrested for his attacks on patriotism and conventional religion and ethics, and for his gospel of terrorism, preached in prose and in many songs such as those in his Proletarier-Liederbuch (Proletarian Songbook). Some of his experiences in prison were recounted in the 1876 work, Die Bastille am Plötzensee: Blätter aus meinem Gefängniss-Tagebuch (The Bastille on Plötzensee: Pages from my Prison Diary).

After advocating violent action, including the use of explosive bombs, as a mechanism to bring about revolutionary change, Most was forced into exile by the government. He went to France but was forced to leave at the end of 1878, settling in London. There he founded his own newspaper, Freiheit (Freedom), with the first issue coming off the press dated 4 January 1879. Convinced by his own experience of the futility of parliamentary action, Most began to espouse the doctrine of anarchism, which led to his expulsion from the German Social Democratic Party in 1880. Encouraged by news of labor struggles and industrial disputes in the United States, Most emigrated to the USA upon his release from prison in 1882. He promptly began agitating in his adopted land among other German émigrés.

German individualist anarchism 
An influential form of individualist anarchism, called "egoism," or egoist anarchism, was expounded by one of the earliest and best-known proponents of individualist anarchism, the German Max Stirner. Stirner's The Ego and Its Own, published in 1844, is a founding text of the philosophy. According to Stirner, the only limitation on the freedom of the individual is their power to obtain what they desire, without regard for God, state, or morality. To Stirner, rights were spooks in the mind, and he held that society as an abstract whole does not exist but rather "the individuals are its reality". Stirner advocated self-assertion and foresaw unions of egoists, voluntary and non-systematic associations continually renewed by all parties' support through an act of will, which Stirner proposed as a form of organization in place of the state. Egoist anarchists claim that egoism will foster genuine and spontaneous union between individuals. "Egoism" has inspired many interpretations of Stirner's philosophy. It was re-discovered and promoted by German philosophical anarchist and LGBT activist John Henry Mackay.

John Henry Mackay

In Germany the Scottish-born German John Henry Mackay became the most important individualist anarchist propagandist. He fused Stirnerist egoism with the positions of Benjamin Tucker and translated Tucker into German. Two semi-fictional writings of his own Die Anarchisten and Der Freiheitsucher contributed to individualist theory, updating egoist themes with respect to the anarchist movement. His writing were translated into English as well. Mackay is also an important European early activist for LGBT rights.

Anarchism in the German Revolution of 1918–1919 and under Nazism 

In the German uprising known as the Bavarian Soviet Republic the anarchists Gustav Landauer, Silvio Gesell and Erich Mühsam had important leadership positions within the revolutionary councilist structures. On 6 April 1919, a Soviet Republic was formally proclaimed. Initially, it was ruled by USPD members such as Ernst Toller, and anarchists like Gustav Landauer, Silvio Gesell and Erich Mühsam.

Erich Mühsam 

Erich Mühsam (6 April 1878 – 10 July 1934) was a German-Jewish anarchist essayist, poet and playwright. He emerged at the end of World War I as one of the leading agitators for a federated Bavarian Soviet Republic. Also a cabaret performer, he achieved international prominence during the years of the Weimar Republic for works which, before Hitler came to power in 1933, condemned Nazism and satirized the future dictator.

Mühsam moved to Berlin in 1900, where he soon became involved in a group called Neue Gemeinschaft (New Society) under the direction of Julius and Heinrich Hart which combined socialist philosophy with theology and communal living in the hopes of becoming "a forerunner of a socially united great working commune of humanity."  Within this group, Mühsam became acquainted with Gustav Landauer who encouraged his artistic growth and compelled the young Mühsam to develop his own activism based on a combination of communist and anarchist political philosophy that Landauer introduced to him.  Desiring more political involvement, in 1904, Mühsam withdrew from Neue Gemeinschaft and relocated temporarily to an artists commune in Ascona, Switzerland where vegetarianism was mixed with communism and socialism. In 1911, Mühsam founded the newspaper, Kain (Cain), as a forum for communist-anarchist ideologies, stating that it would "be a personal organ for whatever the editor, as a poet, as a citizen of the world, and as a fellow man had on his mind."  Mühsam used Kain to ridicule the German state and what he perceived as excesses and abuses of authority, standing out in favour of abolishing capital punishment, and opposing the government's attempt at censoring theatre, and offering prophetic and perceptive analysis of international affairs. For the duration of World War I, publication was suspended to avoid government-imposed censorship often enforced against private newspapers that disagreed with the imperial government and the war.

In 1926, Mühsam founded a new journal which he called Fanal (The Torch), in which he openly and precariously criticized the communists and the far Right-wing conservative elements within the Weimar Republic.  During these years, his writings and speeches took on a violent, revolutionary tone, and his active attempts to organize a united front to oppose the radical Right provoked intense hatred from conservatives and nationalists within the Republic. Mühsam specifically targeted his writings to satirize the growing phenomenon of Nazism, which later raised the ire of Adolf Hitler and Joseph Goebbels.  

Mühsam was arrested on charges unknown in the early morning hours of 28 February 1933, within a few hours after the Reichstag fire in Berlin. Joseph Goebbels, the Nazi propaganda minister, labelled him as one of "those Jewish subversives." On the night of 9 July 1934, Mühsam was tortured and murdered by the Oranienburg concentration camp guards, his battered corpse found hanging in a latrine the next morning.

Rudolf Rocker, German anarchosyndicalism and World War II 

 Rudolf Rocker returned to Germany in November 1918 upon an invitation from Fritz Kater to join him in Berlin to re-build the Free Association of German Trade Unions (FVdG). The FVdG was a radical labor federation that quit the SPD in 1908 and became increasingly syndicalist and anarchist. During World War I, it had been unable to continue its activities for fear of government repression, but remained in existence as an underground organization. Rocker was opposed to the FVdG's alliance with the communists during and immediately after the November Revolution, as he rejected Marxism, especially the concept of the dictatorship of the proletariat. Soon after arriving in Germany, however, he once again became seriously ill. He started giving public speeches in March 1919, including one at a congress of munitions workers in Erfurt, where he urged them to stop producing war material. During this period the FVdG grew rapidly and the coalition with the communists soon began to crumble. Eventually all syndicalist members of the Communist Party were expelled. From 27 to 30 December 1919, the twelfth national congress of the FVdG was held in Berlin. The organization decided to become the Free Workers' Union of Germany (FAUD) under a new platform, which had been written by Rocker: the Prinzipienerklärung des Syndikalismus (Declaration of Syndicalist Principles). It rejected political parties and the dictatorship of the proletariat as bourgeois concepts. The program only recognized de-centralized, purely economic organizations. Although public ownership of land, means of production, and raw materials was advocated, nationalization and the idea of a communist state were rejected. Rocker decried nationalism as the religion of the modern state and opposed violence, championing instead direct action and the education of the workers.

On Gustav Landauer's death during the Munich Soviet Republic uprising, Rocker took over the work of editing the German publications of Kropotkin's writings. In 1920, the social democratic Defense Minister Gustav Noske started the suppression of the revolutionary left, which led to the imprisonment of Rocker and Fritz Kater. During their mutual detainment, Rocker convinced Kater, who had still held some social democratic ideals, completely of anarchism.

In the following years, Rocker became one of the most regular writers in the FAUD organ Der Syndikalist. In 1920, the FAUD hosted an international syndicalist conference, which ultimately led to the founding of the International Workers' Association (IWA) in December 1922. Augustin Souchy, Alexander Schapiro, and Rocker became the organization's secretaries and Rocker wrote its platform. In 1921, he wrote the pamphlet Der Bankrott des russischen Staatskommunismus (The Bankruptcy of Russian State Communism) attacking the Soviet Union. He denounced what he considered a massive oppression of individual freedoms and the suppression of anarchists starting with a purge on 12 April 1918. He supported instead the workers who took part in the Kronstadt uprising and the peasant movement led by the anarchist Nestor Makhno, whom he would meet in Berlin in 1923. In 1924, Rocker published a biography of Johann Most called Das Leben eines Rebellen (The Life of a Rebel). There are great similarities between the men's vitas. It was Rocker who convinced the anarchist historian Max Nettlau to start publication of his anthology Geschichte der Anarchie (History of Anarchy) in 1925.

During the mid-1920s, the decline of Germany's syndicalist movement started. The FAUD had reached its peak of around 150,000 members in 1921, but then started losing members to both the Communist and the Social Democratic Party. Rocker attributed this loss of membership to the mentality of German workers accustomed to military discipline, accusing the communists of using similar tactics to the Nazis and thus attracting such workers. In the 1930 elections, the Nazi Party received 18.3% of all votes, a total of 6 million. Rocker was worried: "Once the Nazis get to power, we'll all go the way of Landauer and Eisner" (who were killed by reactionaries in the course of the Munich Soviet Republic uprising).

After the Reichstag fire on 27 February, Rocker and Witkop decided to leave Germany. As they left they received news of Erich Mühsam's arrest. After his death in July 1934, Rocker would write a pamphlet called Der Leidensweg Erich Mühsams (The Life and Suffering of Erich Mühsam) about the anarchist's fate. Rocker reached Basel, Switzerland on 8 March by the last train to cross the border without being searched. Two weeks later, Rocker and his wife joined Emma Goldman in St. Tropez, France. There he wrote Der Weg ins Dritte Reich (The Path to the Third Reich) about the events in Germany, but it would only be published in Spanish.

In May, Rocker and Witkop moved back to London. There Rocker was welcomed by many of the Jewish anarchists he had lived and fought alongside for many years. He held lectures all over the city. In July, he attended an extraordinary IWA meeting in Paris, which decided to smuggle its organ Die Internationale into Nazi Germany. In 1937, Nationalism and Culture, which he had started work on around 1925, was finally published with the help of anarchists from Chicago Rocker had met in 1933. A Spanish edition was released in three volumes in Barcelona, the stronghold of the Spanish anarchists. It would be his best-known work. In 1938, Rocker published a history of anarchist thought, which he traced all the way back to ancient times, under the name Anarcho-Syndicalism. A modified version of the essay would be published in the Philosophical Library series European Ideologies under the name Anarchism and Anarcho-Syndicalism in 1949.

Post-war 

After World War II, an appeal in the Fraye Arbeter Shtime detailing the plight of German anarchists and called for Americans to support them. By February 1946, the sending of aid parcels to anarchists in Germany was a large-scale operation. In 1947, Rocker published Zur Betrachting der Lage in Deutschland (Regarding the Portrayal of the Situation in Germany) about the impossibility of another anarchist movement in Germany. It became the first post-World War II anarchist writing to be distributed in Germany. Rocker thought young Germans were all either totally cynical or inclined to fascism and awaited a new generation to grow up before anarchism could bloom once again in the country. Nevertheless, the Federation of Libertarian Socialists (FFS) was founded in 1947 by former FAUD members. Rocker wrote for its organ, Die Freie Gesellschaft, which survived until 1953.

Contemporary 
The Free Workers' Union (German: Freie Arbeiterinnen- und Arbeiter-Union or Freie ArbeiterInnen-Union; abbreviated FAU) is a small anarcho-syndicalist union in Germany. It had been the German section of the International Workers' Association (IWA), to which the larger and better known Confederación Nacional del Trabajo in Spain also belongs. The FAU sees itself in the tradition of the Free Workers' Union of Germany (German: Freie Arbeiter Union Deutschlands; FAUD), the largest anarcho-syndicalist union in Germany until it disbanded in 1933 in order to avoid repression by the nascent National Socialist regime, and to illegally organize resistance against it. The FAU was then founded in 1977 and has grown consistently all through the 1990s. Now, the FAU consists of just under 40 groups, organized locally and by branch of trade. Because it rejects hierarchical organizations and political representation and believes in the concept of federalism, most of the decisions are made by the local unions. The federalist organization exists in order to coordinate strikes, campaigns and actions and for communication purposes. There are 800–1000 members organized in the various local unions. The FAU publishes the bimonthly anarcho-syndicalist newspaper Direkte Aktion as well as pamphlets on current and historical topics. Because it supports the classical concept of the abolition of the wage system, the FAU is observed by the Bundesamt für Verfassungsschutz (Federal Office for the Protection of the Constitution).

The Federation of German speaking Anarchists (Föderation Deutschsprachiger AnarchistInnen) is a synthesist anarchist federation of German speaking countries which is affiliated with the International of Anarchist Federations.

The Platform is a platformist and communist anarchist group, founded in Germany in 2019. It was founded because of, according to the organization itself, a "general lack of strategy, extensive public invisibility, as well as a bad external impact" of the anarchist movement in German-speaking countries.

Covid-19 pandemic 

Anarchists, libertarian socialists and anti-fascists in Germany have been protesting what is seen as increased state control and surveillance. Focusing on increasing gentrification, wealth inequality, evictions and police measures. Anarchists have seen increasing evictions of anarchist communities and squats.

German authorities have tried to evict anarchist communities and squats that are the base of anarchist support. During the 2020 pandemic German authorities forcefully evicted Liebig 34, an anarchist autonomous zone. This resulted in clashes with police and riots, as well as large demonstrations in support of Liebig 34. Residents of Liebig 34 were later forcefully removed by German police.

Publications

Der Eigene

Adolf Brand (1874–1945) was a German writer, Stirnerist anarchist and pioneering campaigner for the acceptance of male bisexuality and homosexuality. Brand published the world's first ongoing homosexual publication, Der Eigene in 1896. The name was taken from Stirner, who had greatly influenced the young Brand, and refers to Stirner's concept of "self-ownership" of the individual. Der Eigene concentrated on cultural and scholarly material, and may have averaged around 1500 subscribers per issue during its lifetime. Contributors included Erich Mühsam, Kurt Hiller, John Henry Mackay (under the pseudonym Sagitta) and artists Wilhelm von Gloeden, Fidus and Sascha Schneider. Brand contributed many poems and articles himself. Benjamin Tucker followed this journal from the United States.

Der Einzige 
Der Einzige was a German individualist anarchist magazine. It appeared in 1919, as a weekly, then sporadically until 1925 and was edited by cousins Anselm Ruest (pseud. for Ernst Samuel) and Mynona (pseud. for Salomo Friedlaender). Its title was adopted from the book Der Einzige und sein Eigentum (engl. trans. The Ego and Its Own) by Max Stirner. Another influence was the thought of German philosopher Friedrich Nietzsche. The publication was connected to the local expressionist artistic current and the transition from it towards dada.

Graswurzelrevolution 
Graswurzelrevolution (German for "grassroots revolution") is an anarcho-pacifist magazine founded in 1972 by Wolfgang Hertle in West Germany. It focuses on social equality, anti-militarism and ecology. The magazine is considered the most influential and long-lived anarchist publication of the German post-war period. The zero issue of graswurzelrevolution (GWR) [Grass Roots Revolution] was published in the summer of 1972 in Augsburg, Bavaria. The "monthly magazine for a non-violent, anarchist society" was inspired by "Peace News" (published since 1936 by War Resisters International (WRI) in London), the German-speaking "Direkte Aktion" ("newspaper for anarchism and non-violence"; published from 1965 to 1966 by Wolfgang Zucht and other non-violent activists in Hanover) and the French-speaking "Anarchisme et Nonviolence" (published in Switzerland and France from 1964 to 1973).

References

Bibliography

 
 

 
Germany